Aadavari Matalaku Arthale Verule is a 2007 Indian Telugu-language romantic drama film written and directed by Selvaraghavan (credited as Sri Raghava). The film stars Venkatesh and Trisha while Sriram and Kota Srinivasa Rao play supporting roles. The music composed by Yuvan Shankar Raja. The film's title is based on a song from Missamma (1955), which is partially featured in this film.

The film is released theatrically on 27 April 2007, and became a critical and commercial success. It won three Nandi Awards and one Filmfare Award. Following its success, the film was remade in Tamil as Yaaradi Nee Mohini (Starring Dhanush, Selvaraghavan's brother), in Bengali as 100% Love, in Bhojpuri as Mehandi Laga Ke Rakhna, in Kannada as Anthu Inthu Preethi Banthu and in Odia as Prema Adhei Akshyara.

Plot 
Ganesh is from a middle-class family. He makes several bids to obtain employment but all in vain due to his poor language skills and inadequate educational qualifications. All his friends settle in life, but he continues to struggle in finding employment. Ganesh has two best friends, Vasu and Seenu. His father is a teacher and is always critical of him for being an irresponsible person, only adding to his already long list of woes.

At this juncture, Ganesh catches a glimpse of Keerthi and immediately falls in love with her. He learns that she works for a software solutions firm. Luckily, Ganesh eventually secures employment in the same firm. Keerthi, however, turns out to be a short-tempered young woman. On a business trip, Ganesh accompanies her along with other colleagues to Australia. There he reveals his feelings of love to her. She immediately turns him down, saying that she comes from an orthodox family, and her marriage has already been arranged with her cousin.

Ganesh returns to India in a depressed manner. Unable to see his son in depression, Ganesh's father tries to convince her. But, she insults him for recommending his son's love and accidentally slaps both Ganesh and his father. Later that night, Ganesh's father dies of a heart attack. Ganesh again goes into depression. To ease Ganesh's mood, Vasu persuades him to come along to his family's house in the countryside. Coincidentally, on the train journey, Keerthi is revealed to be Vasu's fiancée. Their grandfather's intention of getting them married earlier is put aside because Vasu and Keerthi leave the house to make their own identity. This causes heartache to their grandfather.

With the passing of a few days, the parents of Keerthi and Vasu decide to get them married to appease their grandfather. After several turns of events, Keerthi realizes that she is in love with Ganesh. Ganesh asks her to forget him, during a late-night meeting, because he believes that it would create problems in their happy family. Keerthi's grandfather notices them conversing and admonishes Keerthi for bringing disrepute to their family and asks Ganesh to leave his village. Ganesh gets ready to leave when he sees everyone putting up decorations for the wedding. Vasu furiously asks him to get out but Ganesh responds that they have misunderstood Keerthi all along. While Ganesh is on his way, the bunch of goons he saved the family from, stab him in the stomach and he is hospitalized.

However, Vasu and Keerthi's wedding is taking place that morning. Upon knowing Ganesh's condition, Seenu asks Vasu to come and help. Though initially reluctant, Vasu abandons his wedding to help Ganesh. Everyone else slowly leaves for the hospital, except Keerthi and her grandfather. Keerthi says that she would never disobey her grandfather. Afterward, her grandfather takes Keerthi to the hospital. While Ganesh recovers and wakes up to leave, he sees that everyone in the family is outside his room, including Keerthi and her grandfather.

In time, Keerthi's family comes to stay with Ganesh for a few days. The film ends when Ganesh and Keerthi become a couple and live together.

Cast 

 Venkatesh as Ganesh
 Trisha as Keerti / Kusumamba
 Sriram as Vasu
 K. Viswanath as Keerti's grandfather
 Kota Srinivasa Rao as Ganesh's father
 Swati Reddy as Pooja / Prasunaamba
 Sunil as Srinu
 Jeeva as Colleague
 Vinaya Prasad
 Suman Setty as Servant Mangayya
 Hari Teja as Keerti's cousin
 Kishori Ballal as Bamma
 Rajya Lakshmi
 Prasad Babu
 Shankar Melkote as Company Head
 G. V. Sudhakar Naidu
 Ananth Babu
 Jaya Lakshmi
 Ramya Chowdary
 Rajshri Reddy
 Devi Sri
 Jaya Lakshmi
 Sri Lalitha
 Padma Reddy
 Junior Relangi
 Meghna Naidu (Special appearance)
 Mumaith Khan (Special appearance)

Production 
Selvaraghavan (under the name of Sri Raghava) directed his maiden Telugu venture which he had committed to make since 2003 with Venkatesh in the leading role. He wrote the script, taking experiences from life experiences of friends who were unemployed graduates, like the film's main character. Jyothika was considered as a lead opposite Venkatesh but she opted out of the contract due to her wedding arrangements. She was later replaced by Trisha.

Soundtrack 

The music was composed by director Sri Raghava's friend and "frequent" composer Yuvan Shankar Raja, teaming up again after producing successful Tamil albums such as Kaadhal Kondein (2003), 7G Rainbow Colony (2004) and Pudhupettai (2006). This film remains their last collaboration (even though later they rejoined in 2021 for the film Nenjam Marappathillai) before they split up, before NGK (2019) and Sri Raghava decided to work with another composer. The soundtrack was released on 28 March 2007 at Rama Naidu studios. It features 6 tracks overall with lyrics by Kulasekhar, Kandi Konda, Sirivennela Sitaramasastri and Chandrabose. Four of the songs were later reused in the Kannada remake of the film, Anthu Inthu Preethi Banthu.

Upon the film's release, the music received positive reviews, being praised as "extraordinary", winning composer Yuvan Shankar Raja much accolades and a nomination at the 2008 Filmfare Awards South for Best Music in Telugu.

Release 
The film is released on 27 April 2007. The film was released on 272 screens, including 15 in Karnataka, 8 in Orissa and 21 overseas.

Reception 

A critic from Rediff called the film "a good entertainer". The film collected 30 crore at the box office. It completed a 50-day run in 200 centres and a 100-day run in 21 centres.

Awards 
Filmfare Awards South
 Best Actress – Trisha
 Nominated: Best Actor – Venkatesh
 Nominated: Best Music Director – Yuvan Shankar Raja

Nandi Awards
 Best Popular Feature Film – N.V. Prasad, Shanam Naga Ashok Kumar
 Best Actor – Venkatesh
 Best Dialogue Writer – Ramesh-Gopi

CineMAA Awards
 Best Actor – Female – Trisha

Santosham Film Awards
 Best Actor – Venkatesh
 Best Character Artist – Kota Srinivasa Rao
 Best Makeup – Raghava

Remakes 
Aadavari Matalaku Arthale Verule was remade in Tamil as Yaaradi Nee Mohini (2008), in Kannada as Anthu Inthu Preethi Banthu (2008), in Odia as Prema Adhei Akhyara (2010), in Bengali as 100% Love (2012), and in Bhojpuri as Mehandi Laga Ke Rakhna (2017).

References

External links 
 

2007 films
2007 romantic drama films
Films directed by Selvaraghavan
Films scored by Yuvan Shankar Raja
Films shot in Australia
Indian romantic drama films
Telugu films remade in other languages